1902 was the 13th season of County Championship cricket in England. Australia had won a classic Test series against England 2–1. The first two Tests were rained off but the final three were full of drama. Victor Trumper scored a century before lunch in the third Test, Australia won the fourth by just 3 runs and England won the fifth by one wicket following a century in 75 minutes by Gilbert Jessop. It was the 21st series between the two teams. Yorkshire won their third consecutive County Championship title and, as in 1901, went through the season with only one defeat.

Honours
County Championship - Yorkshire
Minor Counties Championship - Wiltshire
Wisden - Warwick Armstrong, Cuthbert Burnup, James Iremonger, James Kelly, Victor Trumper

County Championship

Final table 
The final County Championship table is shown below. One point was awarded for a win, none for a draw, and minus one for a loss. Positions were decided on percentage of points over completed games.

 1 Games completed

Points system:

 1 for a win
 0 for a draw, a tie or an abandoned match
 -1 for a loss

Most runs in the County Championship

Most wickets in the County Championship

Ashes tour

In the 1967 Wisden Cricketer's Almanack, A. A. Thomson described this series as "a rubber more exciting than any in history except the Australia v West Indies series in 1960–61".  This description came despite the fact that Australia had secured the series after four of five matches, leading 2–0 before the final Test; the first two matches had been drawn due to rain, with the second match at Lord's yielding only 38 overs in three days.

The third Test, the only one ever to be played at Bramall Lane, saw Australia win by 143 runs, following a brilliant century by Victor Trumper before lunch on the first day. In the fourth Test Australia won by three runs, despite 11 wickets from recalled bowler Bill Lockwood. It came down to Fred Tate and Wilfred Rhodes needing to hit eight runs. Tate hit a four, but was bowled by Jack Saunders with the fourth ball of his over. England came back to win the final Test, conceding a first-innings deficit of 141, then going to 48 for five needing 263 to win, before Gilbert Jessop hit a hundred in 75 minutes and England won by one wicket.

Trumper made a great impression on those who saw him bat. Harry Altham wrote: "From start to finish of the season, on every sort of wicket, against every sort of bowling, Trumper entranced the eye, inspired his side, demoralized his enemies, and made run-getting appear the easiest thing in the world."

Overall first-class statistics

Leading batsmen

Leading bowlers

References

Annual reviews
 Wisden Cricketers' Almanack 1903

External links
 Cricket in England in 1902

1902 in English cricket
1902